Jules Bastien-Lepage (1 November 1848 – 10 December 1884) was a French painter closely associated with the beginning of naturalism, an artistic style that emerged from the later phase of the Realist movement.

His most famous work is his landscape-style portrait of Joan of Arc which currently resides at the Metropolitan Museum in New York City.

Life and work
Bastien-Lepage was born in the village of Damvillers, Meuse, and spent his childhood there.  Bastien's father grew grapes in a vineyard to support the family. His grandfather also lived in the village; his garden had fruit trees of apple, pear, and peach up against the high walls. Bastien took an early liking to drawing, and his parents fostered his creativity by buying prints of paintings for him to copy.

Education

Jules Bastien-Lepage's first teacher was his father, himself an artist. His first formal training was at Verdun. Prompted by a love of art, he went to Paris in 1867, where he was admitted to the École des Beaux-arts, working under Cabanel. He was awarded first place for drawing, but spent most of his time working alone, only occasionally appearing in class. Nevertheless, he completed three years at the école. In a letter to his parents, he complained that the life model was a man in the pose of a mediaeval lutanist. During the Franco-Prussian war in 1870, Bastien fought and was wounded. After the war, he returned home to paint the villagers and recover from his wound. In 1873 he painted his grandfather in the garden, a work that would bring the artist his first success at the Paris Salon.

Early work
After exhibiting works in the Salons of 1870 and 1872, which attracted no attention, in 1874 his Portrait of my Grandfather garnered critical acclaim and received a third-class medal. He also showed Song of Spring, an academically oriented study of rural life, representing a peasant girl sitting on a knoll above a village, surrounded by wood nymphs.

His initial success was confirmed in 1875 by the First Communion, a picture of a little girl minutely worked up in manner that was compared to Hans Holbein, and a Portrait of M. Hayern. In 1875, he took second place in the competition for the Prix de Rome with his Angels appearing to the Shepherds, exhibited again at the Exposition Universelle in 1878. His next attempt to win the Prix de Rome in 1876 with Priam at the Feet of Achilles was again unsuccessful (it is in the Lille gallery), and the painter determined to return to country life. To the Salon of 1877 he sent a full-length Portrait of Lady L. and My Parents; and in 1878 a Portrait of M. Theuriet and Haymaking (Les Foins). The last picture, now in the Musée d'Orsay, was widely praised by critics and the public alike. It secured his status as one of the first painters in the Naturalist school.

Naturalism and acclaim 
After the success of Haymaking, Bastien-Lepage was recognized in France as the leader of the emerging Naturalist school. By 1883, a critic could proclaim that "The whole world paints so much today like M. Bastien-Lepage that M. Bastien-Lepage seems to paint like the whole world." This fame brought him prominent commissions.

His Portrait of Mlle Sarah Bernhardt (1879), painted in a light key, won him the cross of the Legion of Honour. In 1879 he was commissioned to paint the Prince of Wales. In 1880 he exhibited a small portrait of M. Andrieux and Joan of Arc listening to the Voices (now in the Metropolitan Museum of Art); and in the same year, at the Royal Academy, the little portrait of the Prince of Wales. In 1881 he painted The Beggar and the Portrait of Albert Wolf; in 1882 Le Père Jacques; in 1885 Love in a Village, in which we find some trace of Gustave Courbet's influence. His last dated work is The Forge (1884).

Death and legacy

Between 1880 and 1883 he traveled in Italy. The artist, long ailing, had tried in vain to re-establish his health in Algiers. He died in Paris in 1884, when planning a new series of rural subjects. His friend, Prince Bojidar Karageorgevitch, was with him at the end and wrote:
At last he was unable to work anymore; and he died on the 10th of December, 1884, breathing his last in my arms. At his grave's head his mother and brother planted an apple-tree.
In March and April 1885, more than 200 of his pictures were exhibited at the Ecole des Beaux-Arts. In 1889 some of his best-known work was shown at the Paris Exposition Universelle.

Among his more important works, may also be mentioned the portrait of Mme J. Drouet (1883); Gambetta on his death-bed, and some landscapes; The Vintage (1880), and The Thames at London (1882). The Little Chimney-Sweep was never finished. A museum is devoted to him at Montmédy. A statue of Bastien-Lepage by Rodin was erected in Damvillers. An obituary by Prince Bojidar Karageorgevitch, appeared in the Magazine of Art (Cassell) in 1890.

Impact on the reception of Impressionism
The influential English critic Roger Fry credited the wider public's acceptance of the Impressionists, especially Claude Monet, to Bastien-Lepage. In his 1920 Essay in Æsthetics, Fry wrote:

Relationship with Marie Bashkirtseff
Ukrainian-born painter Marie Bashkirtseff formed a close friendship with Bastien-Lepage. Artistically, she took her cue from the French painter's admiration for nature: "I say nothing of the fields because Bastien-Lepage reigns over them as a sovereign; but the streets, however, have not still had their... Bastien." Her best-known work in this naturalist vein is A Meeting (now in the Musée d'Orsay), which was shown to wide acclaim at the Paris Salon of 1884. By a curious coincidence she succumbed to chronic illness the same year as her colleague and friend.

Honours 
 1883: Knight in the Order of Leopold.

Paintings

Notes

References

Sources

 
 André Theuriet, Bastien-Lepage (1885; English edition, 1892); L de Fourcaud, Bastien-Lepage (1885).
 Serge Lemoine, Dominique Lobstein, Marie Lecasseur, et al., Jules Bastien-Lepage 1848–1884 (Paris: Musée d'Orsay, 2007).
 Marnin Young, "The Motionless Look of a Painting: Jules-Bastien Lepage, Les Foins, and the End of Realism", Art History, vol. 37, no. 1 (February 2014): 38–67.

External links
 Analysis of Joan of Arc
 Art Gallery at MuseumSyndicate.com

1848 births
1884 deaths
People from Meuse (department)
19th-century French painters
French male painters
Prix de Rome for painting
19th-century French male artists